Młynki may refer to the following places:
Młynki, Kuyavian-Pomeranian Voivodeship (north-central Poland)
Młynki, Bełchatów County in Łódź Voivodeship (central Poland)
Młynki, Pajęczno County in Łódź Voivodeship (central Poland)
Młynki, Lublin Voivodeship (east Poland)
Młynki, Świętokrzyskie Voivodeship (south-central Poland)
Młynki, Masovian Voivodeship (east-central Poland)
Młynki, Greater Poland Voivodeship (west-central Poland)
Młynki, Chojnice County in Pomeranian Voivodeship (north Poland)
Młynki, Starogard County in Pomeranian Voivodeship (north Poland)
Młynki, Tczew County in Pomeranian Voivodeship (north Poland)
Młynki, Wejherowo County in Pomeranian Voivodeship (north Poland)